The Wonder Ball is a brand of chocolate manufactured in the United States by Nestlé and later by the Frankford Candy & Chocolate Company. The spherical candy, which weighs 3 grams, has an outer shell that is pure milk chocolate and a hollow interior containing candies. The Wonder Ball is wrapped in foil, placed in a small box, and packaged with a collectible sticker. There is a version of the Wonder Ball called the Wonder Ball Plus Prize that contains a chocolate ball that was filled with tangy dextrose candy, stickers, and a small toy.

History 
The Wonder Ball was first introduced in the mid-1990s. The product's slogan was "What's in the Wonder Ball?" Originally called Nestlé Magic Ball, the product contained small figurines of Disney characters, similar to the Kinder Surprise which retails in Europe, Canada, and Mexico. The product was withdrawn in 1997 after competitors and consumer groups campaigned that the toy posed a choking hazard.[1]

In April 2000, the Wonder Ball was then released back with candy in place of the toys.[2] The Wonder Ball had a variety of themes, including Disney, Pokémon, Cartoon Network, Care Bears, and Winnie the Pooh. In 2004, the brand was sold to Frankford, who released it under a SpongeBob SquarePants theme. An urban legend has circulated that the product was discontinued in 2007 because a child choked and died, but there were no confirmation that the discontinuation was due to choking allegations.[3]

After 9 years of absence, Frankford has come back producing the Wonder Ball with Despicable Me themed candy and stickers in February 2016. Other themes included: Shopkins, Dinosaurs, Disney, and Halloween. Wonder Ball Minis were introduced as two smaller Wonder Balls packaged together to enable sharing. In 2017, they opened up different themes such as Shopkins, Super Mario, Monsters, and PAW Patrol. In 2021, Space Jam: A New Legacy toys were released.[4]

Nutritional facts 
The Wonder Ball had 130 calories per unit, which fifty-four came from fat. "There were 6 grams of fat per serving. Added to this was 18 grams of sugar."[3] The sugar content is worth noting because usually it was thought as sweet (and now containing this much sugar), chocolate's historically did not contain sugar before it began to take the form of the many candies like these that we know today. [5]

In addition to these, the Wonder Ball also contained 15 milligrams of sodium and between 19 and 22 grams of carbohydrates. [6]

See also
 Kinder Surprise
List of confectionery brands

References

Nestlé brands
Products introduced in 2000